Tie malé výlety is a 1972 Czechoslovak film. The film starred Josef Kemr.

References

1972 films
Czechoslovak comedy films
1970s Czech-language films
Czech comedy films
1970s Czech films